Hokejski klub Celje or simply HK Celje is an ice hockey club from Celje, Slovenia. The club was established in 1998. They play their home matches at Celje Ice Hall with a seating capacity for 400 spectators.

References

External links
Official website 

Ice hockey clubs established in 1998
Ice hockey teams in Slovenia
Sport in Celje
1998 establishments in Slovenia
Slovenian Ice Hockey League teams
Inter-National League teams